Dewey is the name of some places in the U.S. state of Wisconsin:
Dewey, Burnett County, Wisconsin, a town
Dewey, Portage County, Wisconsin, a town
Dewey, Rusk County, Wisconsin, a town
Dewey (community), Wisconsin, an unincorporated community

See also
Dewey Corners, Wisconsin, an unincorporated community
Dewey Marsh, Wisconsin, a state wildlife refuge